DKR may refer to:

IATA airport code for Léopold Sédar Senghor International Airport, which services Dakar, Senegal
Unofficial shorthand for the Danish krone
Batman: The Dark Knight Returns, a comic book
The Dark Knight Rises, the third installment in Christopher Nolan's Batman movie series
Darrell Royal (1924–2012), college football coach
Darrell K Royal–Texas Memorial Stadium, a stadium named partly after the college football coach
Dynamic knowledge repository, a strategic concept
Diddy Kong Racing, a 1997 video game for the Nintendo 64
Diddy Kong Racing DS, version for Nintendo DS
DKR Engineering, a Luxembourgian racing team
"DKR" (song), a 2016 song by Booba
DKR fictional music group from On Cinema